Muramura williamsi is an extinct Australian wynardiid marsupial, related to the modern koala and wombat. Around the size of a dog, it was a herbivore.  Fossils range in age from the Late Oligocene to the Pliocene in age.

References 

Prehistoric mammals of Australia
Oligocene marsupials
Miocene marsupials
Pliocene marsupials
Prehistoric vombatiforms
Prehistoric marsupial genera